Space Gun may refer to:
Space gun, a method of launching an object into space
Space Gun (album), a 2018 album by Guided by Voices
Space Gun (video game), a 1990 arcade game
Ljutic Space Gun, a 12 gauge single-shot shotgun

See also
 Hand-Held Maneuvering Unit, or maneuvering gun or zip gun, a device used in spacewalks
 Raygun, a science-fiction directed-energy weapon 
 TP-82 Cosmonaut survival pistol, carried by cosmonauts on space missions
 Space warfare and space weapons